Musha is a village in Rwanda.

It was a site of a major massacre in the Rwandan genocide against the Tutsis, where over 1,000 people were killed.

Now it is known as a health center for the region.

References

Populated places in Rwanda